The Foolish Years are a Yugoslav series of films spawned from the 1977 movie of the same name. The original film and its nine sequels were all directed by Zoran Čalić between 1977 and 1992. The series became widely known informally as Žikina dinastija (Žika's Dynasty), the title of the 7th film (sixth sequel) released in 1985. The informal name of the series parodied the American TV soap opera Dynasty, which was enormously popular throughout Yugoslavia in the mid-1980s.

What would eventually turn into a film series began in 1977 with Lude godine. Centered around a teenage couple, Boba (Vladimir Petrović) and Marija (Rialda Kadrić), one of the film's goals was addressing societal issues such as unprotected sex and teen pregnancy. However, the ensemble of supporting characters—most notably the in-laws Živorad "Žika" Pavlović (Dragomir Bojanić Gidra) and Milan Todorović (Marko Todorović)—captured audiences' attention by displaying great comedic potential. This was later exploited in nine subsequent sequels as all of them revolved around the pair of in-laws—wacky working class Žika and strait-laced intellectual Milan—rather than the young couple.

Nearly every single film in the series was lambasted by film critics. Most disliked it for what they saw to be poor directorial choices and crude folksy humour loaded with rural and urban stereotypes that are displayed through the characters of Žika and Milan, respectively. Despite its low-brow reputation, the series proved to be a valuable training ground and career springboard for many acting talents and future stars of Yugoslav/Serb cinema like Sonja Savić, Zoran Cvijanović, Nikola Kojo, Gala Videnović, Branko Đurić and others.

Domestically, the films were box-office successes, and were popular in the USSR.

Films
The films in the series are:

Lude godine (Foolish Years), (1977)
 Došlo doba da se ljubav proba (The Time has Come to Taste the Love) a.k.a. Lude godine II (Wacky Years II, 1980)
Ljubi, ljubi, al' glavu ne gubi (Kiss, Kiss, but Don't Lose Your Head, 1981)
Kakav deda takav unuk (Like Grandpa, Like Grandson, 1983)
Idi mi, dođi mi (Come to me and Go from me, 1983)
Šta se zgodi kad se ljubav rodi (What Happens When Love Comes to Town, 1984)
Žikina dinastija (Žika's Dynasty, 1985)
Druga Žikina dinastija (Second Žika's Dynasty, 1986)
Treća Žikina Dinastija (Third Zika's Dynasty 1988)
Žikina ženidba (Žika's Wedding, 1992), also known as Ženidba Žike Pavlovića (The Wedding of Žika Pavlović) in Croatia
 Povratak Žikine dinastije (Žika's Dynasty Returns), cancelled in 2018 in production phase, due to lack of government funding.

References

Film series
Serbian comedy-drama films
Serbian-language films
Yugoslav comedy-drama films
1977 comedy-drama films
Films set in Serbia
Films set in Yugoslavia
1980 comedy-drama films
Films set in Belgrade
Films shot in Belgrade
1981 comedy-drama films
1983 comedy-drama films
1984 comedy-drama films
1985 comedy-drama films
1986 comedy-drama films
1988 comedy-drama films